Joseph Beruh (1924 – October 30, 1989) was an American theatrical producer of Broadway and Off-Broadway plays and musicals. He worked frequently with Edgar Lansbury as co-producer. For 15 years, he was the general manager of the Sheridan Square Playhouse. He also produced films and was an occasion actor. Beruh was a graduate of Carnegie Mellon University. He died in his sleep of a heart attack at age 65.

Notable productions
The Magic Show (1974)
Gypsy (1974)
The Night That Made America Famous (1975)
Godspell (1976)
American Buffalo (1977)

Film Producer
The Clairvoyant (1982)
He Knows You're Alone (1980)
Blue Sunshine (1977)
Squirm (1976)
The Wild Party (1975)
Camera Three (1971)

References

External links

1989 deaths
American theatre managers and producers
People from Pittsburgh
Carnegie Mellon University alumni